Joey Pecoraro is an American musician and record producer from Detroit, Michigan. He rose to prominence in the lo-fi hip hop movement of the late 2010s with the title track from his self-released debut studio album Tired Boy (2017). This album also spawned the track "Finding Parking", which was used as the musical base of "All Night Parking" from British singer Adele's album 30 (2021).

Discography
Old Time Radio (Alpha Pup Records, 2021)
Sea Monster (Alpha Pup Records, 2020)
Deep In A Dream Of You (2019)
Music For Happiness (2018)
Tired Boy (2017)
Little Pear (2015)

Awards and nominations

References

External links
Official website

Musicians from Detroit
American record producers
Living people
Year of birth missing (living people)